C-P-3.com is the fourth studio album by the rapper C-Murder. It was released on October 23, 2001, by TRU Records and Priority Records with production by Rod (Bass Heavy) Tillman Carlos Stephens and Donald XL Robertson. It was C-Murder's first album since leaving No Limit Records.

Commercial performance
C-P-3.com was not as successful as C-Murder's previous three albums, only peaking at #45 on the Billboard 200 and #10 on the Top R&B/Hip-Hop Albums. C-P-3.com has sold over 250,000 copies to date.

Singles
There were two music videos from the album, "What U Gonna Do" and "I'm Not Just". Both were released in 2002, although the single and radio versions were released in 2001. They were C-Murder's last two music videos before he was arrested in 2002 for allegedly beating and shooting a fan. BET and MTV stopped playing the videos after his arrest.

Track listing
"Start" — 1:33
"What U Gonna Do" (featuring Ms. Peaches, Silkk the Shocker) — 4:01
"Don't Make Me" (featuring T-Bo & Reginelli) — 3:44
"I'm Not Just" (featuring Soulja Slim & T-Bo) — 3:21
"Get Bucked" (featuring Master P, Silkk the Shocker & T-Bo) — 3:09
"Let Me See" — 4:10
"Boat Ride" — 1:10
"Criminal Minded" (featuring Afficial) — 3:26
"Don't Matter" (featuring Erica Fox) — 3:12
"Young Ghetto Boy" (featuring Ms. Peaches) — 2:48
"Ya Dig" — 4:19
"Drive Thru 1" — 2:01
"That's Me" — 3:14
"Do You Wanna Ride" (featuring Black Felon, Slay Sean & Traci) — 3:37
"NL Soulja" (Featuring New-9 & Wayngo) — 2:50
"Drive Thru 2" — 1:01  
"Down for My B's" (featuring Mia X, Ms. Peaches & Traci) — 4:19
"Thug Boy" — 4:07
"Projects" (featuring New-9 & Wayngo) — 5:10
"Finish" — 1:22

Chart positions

References

C-Murder albums
2001 albums
Priority Records albums
No Limit Records albums